WKST-FM (96.1 MHz) - branded as 96.1 KISS - is a Top 40 (CHR) outlet based in Pittsburgh, Pennsylvania. Owned by iHeartMedia, the station broadcasts with an ERP of 44 kW. Its transmitter is located in Baldwin.

History

The station originally signed on August 8, 1960 as WCAE-FM, co-owned with WCAE (AM) and WTAE-TV, 
 
and had a MOR format until 1976, when it simulcasted WTAE (AM) during the day and played disco at night, and became known as "Disco 96."  As disco began to wane in popularity, the station flipped to a rock-leaning top 40 format as WXKX (96KX or "96 Kicks").  96KX thrived for the next five years and ranked as the frequency's most highly rated format for three decades. On January 17, 1983, faced with new competition from WBZZ (B-94), the station shifted to a more mainstream top 40 format and became "HitRadio 96".  The call letters were changed to WHTX on March 25, 1983. Later in the decade, the station evolved into a gold-based adult contemporary format under the name of "Gold 96".

On June 26, 1991, it switched calls to WVTY ("Variety 96") and format to an Adult Top 40 approach, which in turn would lead to a Modern AC format ("96.1 The River") on November 26, 1997. New call letters WDRV would follow on February 27, 1998. On February 12, 1999, at 5 p.m., WDRV returned to Adult Top 40, this time as WPHH ("Mix 96.1"). On September 29, 2000, at 5 p.m., they switched to the current format and became the current WKST-FM, "96.1 Kiss". During its first four years, WKST waged a battle with WBZZ from 2000 to 2004 by countering WBZZ's conventional Top 40/CHR approach with WKST's Rhythmic flavor. In 2007, the rivalry resumed again when CBS revived "B94" and used the same conventional direction by going after the same 18-34 audience that WKST has managed to cater.  However, B94 still could not compete with WKST-FM, and would switch formats again, this time to sports talk in 2010.

In 2012, WKST-FM became the first Top 40 (CHR) in Pittsburgh radio history to record #1 6+ and 12+ ratings.

Programming
As mentioned above, WKST's musical direction had always favored Rhythmic and/or Dance hits since its 2000 debut, although at times it will add pop/rock artists like The Lumineers to stay within the Mainstream realm.  With B94 changing formats after Valentine's Day 2010, WKST-FM became the only top 40 station in Pittsburgh, and with competition coming from Adult Top 40 WBZZ (whose direction leans towards Mainstream Top 40 and Rhythmic Contemporary) and a new version of WAMO (via an FM translator, as the AM is a daytimer; now a full-blown Rhythmic Top 40), WKST has continued to add more Rhythmic hits to distinguish itself from the two stations.

In addition, WKST is the Pittsburgh affiliate for On Air with Ryan Seacrest weekdays, the iHeartRadio Countdown on Saturday mornings  and American Top 40 on Sunday mornings.

The Morning Freak Show
The Morning Freak Show with Mikey and Big Bob is KISS-FM's morning show. Mikey and Big Bob were involved with two other shows sharing The Freak Show name, the first one on WDRQ in Detroit, Michigan. This show was followed by another one at WIOQ in Philadelphia, Pennsylvania. These two show were originally hosted by Tic Tak with Mikey and Big Bob as his co-hosts. When the offer came in for the morning show at WKST-FM, Tic Tak did not choose to stay with the show.

WKST-FM HD2
On April 25, 2006, iHeartMedia (then Clear Channel Communications) announced that WKST-FM's HD2 subchannel will carry a format focusing on Dance hits. The HD2 signed on July 17, 2006, broadcasting the Club Phusion format, which was later replaced with the EDM-focused "Evolution" brand.

In 2015, WKST-FM HD2 changed formats to "My 2K (which has since been renamed "iHeart 2000s"), airing a 2000s hits format (the channel can be streamed on the iHeartradio's mobile application and platform).

In March 2016, WKST-FM HD2 moved iHeart 2000s over to WXDX-FM HD2, and replaced it with Pride Radio.

References

FCC: WKST-FM Callsign History

External links
Official website
"Pride Radio" on WKST-HD2

KST-FM
Contemporary hit radio stations in the United States
Radio stations established in 1960
IHeartMedia radio stations